The 1976 United States presidential election in Virginia took place on November 2, 1976. All 50 states and the District of Columbia were part of the 1976 United States presidential election. Virginia voters chose 12 electors to the Electoral College, which selected the president and vice president of the United States.

Virginia was narrowly won by incumbent United States President Gerald Ford of Michigan with 49.29% of the vote, who was running against Governor Jimmy Carter of Georgia. The national election was ultimately won by Carter with 50.08% of the vote. Virginia and Oklahoma were the only states that Ford won in the South. Key to Ford’s win were the Richmond and Washington D.C. suburban counties of Henrico and Fairfax, which he won by over 42,000 votes. Ironically, many of these suburban areas would eventually shift Virginia away from the Republicans starting in 2008.

Carter did do relatively well in many rural sections of Virginia – for instance he is the solitary Democratic presidential nominee to top 40% in traditionally arch-Republican Floyd County since Grover Cleveland in 1892. , this is the last occasion a Democratic presidential nominee has carried Amelia County, Bedford County, Botetourt County, Charlotte County, Cumberland County, Fluvanna County, Gloucester County, Goochland County, Grayson County, Halifax County, King George County, New Kent County, Nottoway County, Patrick County, Prince George County, Rappahannock County, Rockbridge County, Scott County, Spotsylvania County, Warren County, Bristol City and Salem City, while Stafford County would not vote for the Democratic nominee again until 2020.

Results

Results by county

References

Virginia
1976
1976 Virginia elections